The 2009–10 Serie A is the 76th season of ice hockey in Italy since the league's inception in 1925.

Teams

Regular season

Standings

Legend: GP = Games played; W = Regulation Wins; OTW= Overtime Wins; OTL = Overtime losses; L = Regulation losses; GF = Goals for; GA = Goals against; P = Points

Val Pusteria were placed above Asiago as a result of head-to-head competition during the regular season.

Playoffs

References

External links
  

2009-10
Ita
2009–10 in Italian ice hockey